Oktyabrsky (masculine), Oktyabrskaya (feminine) or Oktyabrskoye (neuter) is the name of several inhabited localities in Russia.

Modern localities

Republic of Adygea
As of 2012, one rural locality in the Republic of Adygea bears this name:
Oktyabrsky, Republic of Adygea, a khutor in Maykopsky District;

Altai Krai
As of 2012, nine rural localities in Altai Krai bear this name:
Oktyabrsky, Aleysky District, Altai Krai, a settlement in Aleysky Selsoviet of Aleysky District; 
Oktyabrsky, Kamensky District, Altai Krai, a settlement in Prigorodny Selsoviet of Kamensky District; 
Oktyabrsky, Kulundinsky District, Altai Krai, a settlement in Oktyabrsky Selsoviet of Kulundinsky District; 
Oktyabrsky, Kytmanovsky District, Altai Krai (or Oktyabrskoye), a settlement in Oktyabrsky Selsoviet of Kytmanovsky District; 
Oktyabrsky, Suyetsky District, Altai Krai, a settlement in Verkh-Suyetsky Selsoviet of Suyetsky District; 
Oktyabrsky, Troitsky District, Altai Krai, a settlement in Gordeyevsky Selsoviet of Troitsky District; 
Oktyabrsky, Zmeinogorsky District, Altai Krai, a settlement in Oktyabrsky Selsoviet of Zmeinogorsky District; 
Oktyabrsky, Zonalny District, Altai Krai, a settlement in Oktyabrsky Selsoviet of Zonalny District; 
Oktyabrskoye, Altai Krai (or Oktyabrsky), a selo in Sibirsky Selsoviet of Pervomaysky District;

Altai Republic
As of 2012, one rural locality in the Altai Republic bears this name:
Oktyabrskoye, Altai Republic, a settlement in Gorbunovskoye Rural Settlement of Ust-Koksinsky District;

Amur Oblast
As of 2012, two rural localities in Amur Oblast bear this name:
Oktyabrsky, Amur Oblast, a selo in Oktyabrsky Rural Settlement of Zeysky District
Oktyabrskoye, Amur Oblast, a selo in Kovrizhsky Rural Settlement of Konstantinovsky District

Arkhangelsk Oblast
As of 2012, one urban locality in Arkhangelsk Oblast bears this name:
Oktyabrsky, Arkhangelsk Oblast, a work settlement in Ustyansky District

Astrakhan Oblast
As of 2012, one rural locality in Astrakhan Oblast bears this name:
Oktyabrsky, Astrakhan Oblast, a settlement in Lebyazhinsky Selsoviet of Kamyzyaksky District;

Republic of Bashkortostan
As of 2012, seven inhabited localities in the Republic of Bashkortostan bear this name:

Urban localities
Oktyabrsky, Republic of Bashkortostan, a city incorporated as a city of republic significance; 

Rural localities
Oktyabrsky, Duvansky District, Republic of Bashkortostan, a village in Duvansky Selsoviet of Duvansky District; 
Oktyabrsky, Iglinsky District, Republic of Bashkortostan (or Oktyabrskoye), a village in Nadezhdinsky Selsoviet of Iglinsky District; 
Oktyabrsky, Karaidelsky District, Republic of Bashkortostan, a village in Kirzinsky Selsoviet of Karaidelsky District; 
Oktyabrsky, Ufimsky District, Republic of Bashkortostan, a selo in Shemyaksky Selsoviet of Ufimsky District; 
Oktyabrskoye, Iglinsky District, Republic of Bashkortostan (or Oktyabrsky), a village in Tavtimanovsky Selsoviet of Iglinsky District; 
Oktyabrskoye, Sterlitamaksky District, Republic of Bashkortostan, a selo in Oktyabrsky Selsoviet of Sterlitamaksky District;

Belgorod Oblast
As of 2012, two inhabited localities in Belgorod Oblast bear this name:

Urban localities
Oktyabrsky, Belgorodsky District, Belgorod Oblast, a settlement in Belgorodsky District; 

Rural localities
Oktyabrsky, Gubkinsky District, Belgorod Oblast, a khutor in Gubkinsky District;

Bryansk Oblast
As of 2012, five rural localities in Bryansk Oblast bear this name:
Oktyabrsky, Bryansky District, Bryansk Oblast, a settlement in Zhurinichsky Rural Administrative Okrug of Bryansky District; 
Oktyabrsky, Pochepsky District, Bryansk Oblast, a settlement in Baklansky Rural Administrative Okrug of Pochepsky District; 
Oktyabrsky, Unechsky District, Bryansk Oblast, a settlement in Ivaytensky Rural Administrative Okrug of Unechsky District; 
Oktyabrskoye, Bryansky District, Bryansk Oblast, a selo in Dobrunsky Rural Administrative Okrug of Bryansky District; 
Oktyabrskoye, Surazhsky District, Bryansk Oblast, a selo in Vlazovichsky Rural Administrative Okrug of Surazhsky District;

Republic of Buryatia
As of 2012, one rural locality in the Republic of Buryatia bears this name:
Oktyabrsky, Republic of Buryatia, a settlement in Bolshekudarinsky Selsoviet of Kyakhtinsky District

Chechen Republic
As of 2012, two rural localities in the Chechen Republic bear this name:
Oktyabrskoye, Groznensky District, Chechen Republic, a selo in Oktyabrskaya Rural Administration of Groznensky District
Oktyabrskoye, Vedensky District, Chechen Republic, a selo in Vedenskaya Rural Administration of Vedensky District

Chelyabinsk Oblast
As of 2012, seven rural localities in Chelyabinsk Oblast bear this name:
Oktyabrsky, Miass, Chelyabinsk Oblast, a settlement under the administrative jurisdiction of the City of Miass
Oktyabrsky, Bredinsky District, Chelyabinsk Oblast, a settlement in Belokamensky Selsoviet of Bredinsky District
Oktyabrsky, Kizilsky District, Chelyabinsk Oblast, a settlement in Granitny Selsoviet of Kizilsky District
Oktyabrsky, Krasnoarmeysky District, Chelyabinsk Oblast, a settlement in Berezovsky Selsoviet of Krasnoarmeysky District
Oktyabrsky, Kusinsky District, Chelyabinsk Oblast, a settlement in Zlokazovsky Selsoviet of Kusinsky District
Oktyabrsky, Uysky District, Chelyabinsk Oblast, a settlement in Uysky Selsoviet of Uysky District
Oktyabrskoye, Chelyabinsk Oblast, a selo in Oktyabrsky Selsoviet of Oktyabrsky District

Chuvash Republic
As of 2012, two rural localities in the Chuvash Republic bear this name:
Oktyabrskoye, Mariinsko-Posadsky District, Chuvash Republic, a selo in Oktyabrskoye Rural Settlement of Mariinsko-Posadsky District
Oktyabrskoye, Poretsky District, Chuvash Republic, a selo in Oktyabrskoye Rural Settlement of Poretsky District

Republic of Crimea
As of 2012, four inhabited localities in Republic of Crimea bear this name:

Urban localities
Oktyabrskoye, Krasnogvardeysky District, Republic of Crimea, an urban-type settlement in Krasnogvardeysky District

Rural localities
Oktyabrskoye, Leninsky District, Republic of Crimea, a selo in Leninsky District
Oktyabrskoye, Pervomaysky District, Republic of Crimea, a selo in Pervomaysky District
Oktyabrskoye, Sovetsky District, Republic of Crimea, a selo in Sovetsky District

Republic of Dagestan
As of 2012, two rural localities in the Republic of Dagestan bear this name:
Oktyabrskoye, Khasavyurtovsky District, Republic of Dagestan, a selo in Oktyabrsky Selsoviet of Khasavyurtovsky District; 
Oktyabrskoye, Kizlyarsky District, Republic of Dagestan, a selo in Kizlyarsky Selsoviet of Kizlyarsky District;

Irkutsk Oblast
As of 2015, four inhabited localities in Irkutsk Oblast bear this name:

Urban localities
Oktyabrsky, Chunsky District, Irkutsk Oblast, a work settlement in Chunsky District

Rural localities
Oktyabrsky, Kuytunsky District, Irkutsk Oblast, a settlement in Kuytunsky District
Oktyabrsky, Nizhneudinsky District, Irkutsk Oblast, an area in Nizhneudinsky District
Oktyabrsky, Usolsky District, Irkutsk Oblast, a settlement in Usolsky District

Ivanovo Oblast
As of 2012, three rural localities in Ivanovo Oblast bear this name:
Oktyabrsky, Kineshemsky District, Ivanovo Oblast, a selo in Kineshemsky District
Oktyabrsky, Komsomolsky District, Ivanovo Oblast, a selo in Komsomolsky District
Oktyabrsky, Zavolzhsky District, Ivanovo Oblast, a selo in Zavolzhsky District

Jewish Autonomous Oblast
As of 2012, one rural locality in the Jewish Autonomous Oblast bears this name:
Oktyabrskoye, Jewish Autonomous Oblast, a selo in Leninsky District

Kabardino-Balkar Republic
As of 2012, two rural localities in the Kabardino-Balkar Republic bear this name:
Oktyabrskoye, Maysky District, Kabardino-Balkar Republic (or Oktyabrsky), a selo in Maysky District; 
Oktyabrskoye, Zolsky District, Kabardino-Balkar Republic, a selo in Zolsky District;

Kaliningrad Oblast
As of 2012, four rural localities in Kaliningrad Oblast bear this name:
Oktyabrskoye, Bagrationovsky District, Kaliningrad Oblast, a settlement in Pogranichny Rural Okrug of Bagrationovsky District
Oktyabrskoye, Polessky District, Kaliningrad Oblast, a settlement in Zalesovsky Rural Okrug of Polessky District
Oktyabrskoye, Pravdinsky District, Kaliningrad Oblast, a settlement under the administrative jurisdiction of the town of district significance of Pravdinsk in Pravdinsky District
Oktyabrskoye, Slavsky District, Kaliningrad Oblast, a settlement in Timiryazevsky Rural Okrug of Slavsky District

Republic of Kalmykia
As of 2012, three rural localities in the Republic of Kalmykia bear this name:
Oktyabrsky, Priyutnensky District, Republic of Kalmykia, a settlement in Oktyabrskaya Rural Administration of Priyutnensky District; 
Oktyabrsky, Yashaltinsky District, Republic of Kalmykia, a settlement in Oktyabrskaya Rural Administration of Yashaltinsky District; 
Oktyabrsky, Yustinsky District, Republic of Kalmykia, a settlement in Yustinskaya Rural Administration of Yustinsky District;

Kaluga Oblast
As of 2012, one rural locality in Kaluga Oblast bears this name:
Oktyabrsky, Kaluga Oblast, a settlement in Ferzikovsky District

Kamchatka Krai
As of 2012, one rural locality in Kamchatka Krai bears this name:
Oktyabrsky, Kamchatka Krai, a settlement in Ust-Bolsheretsky District

Karachay-Cherkess Republic
As of 2012, one rural locality in the Karachay-Cherkess Republic bears this name:
Oktyabrsky, Karachay-Cherkess Republic, a settlement in Prikubansky District;

Republic of Karelia
As of 2012, one rural locality in the Republic of Karelia bears this name:
Oktyabrskaya, Republic of Karelia, a village in Pudozhsky District

Kemerovo Oblast
As of 2012, six rural localities in Kemerovo Oblast bear this name:
Oktyabrsky, Belovsky District, Kemerovo Oblast, a settlement in Bekovskaya Rural Territory of Belovsky District; 
Oktyabrsky, Prokopyevsky District, Kemerovo Oblast, a settlement in Kuzbasskaya Rural Territory of Prokopyevsky District; 
Oktyabrsky, Promyshlennovsky District, Kemerovo Oblast, a settlement in Kalinkinskaya Rural Territory of Promyshlennovsky District; 
Oktyabrsky, Topkinsky District, Kemerovo Oblast, a settlement in Zarubinskaya Rural Territory of Topkinsky District; 
Oktyabrsky, Tyazhinsky District, Kemerovo Oblast, a settlement in Novovostochnaya Rural Territory of Tyazhinsky District; 
Oktyabrsky, Yashkinsky District, Kemerovo Oblast, a settlement in Polomoshinskaya Rural Territory of Yashkinsky District;

Khabarovsk Krai
As of 2012, three inhabited localities in Khabarovsk Krai bear this name:

Urban localities
Oktyabrsky, Vaninsky District, Khabarovsk Krai, a work settlement in Vaninsky District
 The former Postovaya (air base) is nearby. 

Rural localities
Oktyabrsky, Komsomolsky District, Khabarovsk Krai, a settlement in Komsomolsky District
Oktyabrsky, imeni Poliny Osipenko District, Khabarovsk Krai, a settlement in imeni Poliny Osipenko District

Khanty-Mansi Autonomous Okrug
As of 2012, one urban locality in Khanty-Mansi Autonomous Okrug bears this name:
Oktyabrskoye, Khanty-Mansi Autonomous Okrug, an urban-type settlement in Oktyabrsky District

Kirov Oblast
As of 2012, eight rural localities in Kirov Oblast bear this name:
Oktyabrsky, Falyonsky District, Kirov Oblast, a settlement in Medvezhensky Rural Okrug of Falyonsky District; 
Oktyabrsky, Murashinsky District, Kirov Oblast, a settlement in Bezbozhnikovsky Rural Okrug of Murashinsky District; 
Oktyabrsky, Slobodskoy District, Kirov Oblast, a settlement in Oktyabrsky Rural Okrug of Slobodskoy District; 
Oktyabrsky, Sovetsky District, Kirov Oblast, a settlement in Rodyginsky Rural Okrug of Sovetsky District; 
Oktyabrsky, Zuyevsky District, Kirov Oblast, a settlement in Oktyabrsky Rural Okrug of Zuyevsky District; 
Oktyabrskoye, Kirov Oblast (or Oktyabrskaya), a selo in Yumsky Rural Okrug of Svechinsky District; 
Oktyabrskaya (railway station), Lesnoy, Verkhnekamsky District, Kirov Oblast, a railway station under the administrative jurisdiction of Lesnoy Urban-Type Settlement in Verkhnekamsky District; 
Oktyabrskaya (village), Lesnoy, Verkhnekamsky District, Kirov Oblast, a village under the administrative jurisdiction of Lesnoy Urban-Type Settlement in Verkhnekamsky District;

Komi Republic
As of 2012, one urban locality in the Komi Republic bears this name:
Oktyabrsky, Komi Republic, an urban-type settlement under the administrative jurisdiction of Severny Urban-Type Settlement Administrative Territory under the administrative jurisdiction of the city of republic significance of Vorkuta;

Kostroma Oblast
As of 2012, two rural localities in Kostroma Oblast bear this name:
Oktyabrsky, Kologrivsky District, Kostroma Oblast, a settlement in Ileshevskoye Settlement of Kologrivsky District; 
Oktyabrsky, Manturovsky District, Kostroma Oblast, a settlement in Oktyabrskoye Settlement of Manturovsky District;

Krasnodar Krai
As of 2012, twenty rural localities in Krasnodar Krai bear this name:
Oktyabrsky, Goryachy Klyuch, Krasnodar Krai, a settlement in Kutaissky Rural Okrug under the administrative jurisdiction of the Town of Goryachy Klyuch; 
Oktyabrsky, Krasnodar, Krasnodar Krai, a khutor in Kalininsky Rural Okrug under the administrative jurisdiction of Prikubansky Okrug under the administrative jurisdiction of the City of Krasnodar; 
Oktyabrsky, Kavkazsky District, Krasnodar Krai, a settlement in Mirskoy Rural Okrug of Kavkazsky District; 
Oktyabrsky, Krasnoarmeysky District, Krasnodar Krai, a settlement in Oktyabrsky Rural Okrug of Krasnoarmeysky District; 
Oktyabrsky, Kurganinsky District, Krasnodar Krai, a settlement in Oktyabrsky Rural Okrug of Kurganinsky District; 
Oktyabrsky, Kushchyovsky District, Krasnodar Krai, a settlement in Pervomaysky Rural Okrug of Kushchyovsky District; 
Oktyabrsky, Leningradsky District, Krasnodar Krai, a settlement in Novoumansky Rural Okrug of Leningradsky District; 
Oktyabrsky, Novopokrovsky District, Krasnodar Krai, a settlement in Nezamayevsky Rural Okrug of Novopokrovsky District; 
Oktyabrsky, Pavlovsky District, Krasnodar Krai, a settlement in Srednechelbassky Rural Okrug of Pavlovsky District; 
Oktyabrsky, Primorsko-Akhtarsky District, Krasnodar Krai, a settlement in Olginsky Rural Okrug of Primorsko-Akhtarsky District; 
Oktyabrsky, Seversky District, Krasnodar Krai, a settlement under the administrative jurisdiction of Chernomorsky Settlement Okrug in Seversky District; 
Oktyabrsky, Tbilissky District, Krasnodar Krai, a settlement in Tbilissky Rural Okrug of Tbilissky District; 
Oktyabrsky, Temryuksky District, Krasnodar Krai, a settlement under the administrative jurisdiction of the Town of Temryuk in Temryuksky District; 
Oktyabrsky, Timashyovsky District, Krasnodar Krai, a settlement in Poselkovy Rural Okrug of Timashyovsky District; 
Oktyabrsky, Tuapsinsky District, Krasnodar Krai, a settlement in Oktyabrsky Rural Okrug of Tuapsinsky District; 
Oktyabrsky, Ust-Labinsky District, Krasnodar Krai, a khutor under the administrative jurisdiction of the Town of Ust-Labinsk in Ust-Labinsky District; 
Oktyabrsky, Vyselkovsky District, Krasnodar Krai, a settlement in Gazyrsky Rural Okrug of Vyselkovsky District; 
Oktyabrsky, Yeysky District, Krasnodar Krai, a settlement in Yeysky Rural Okrug of Yeysky District; 
Oktyabrskaya, Belorechensky District, Krasnodar Krai (or Oktyabrsky, Oktyabrskoye), a stanitsa in Bzhedukhovsky Rural Okrug of Belorechensky District; 
Oktyabrskaya, Krylovsky District, Krasnodar Krai (or Oktyabrsky), a stanitsa in Oktyabrsky Rural Okrug of Krylovsky District;

Krasnoyarsk Krai
As of 2012, two rural localities in Krasnoyarsk Krai bear this name:
Oktyabrsky, Boguchansky District, Krasnoyarsk Krai, a settlement in Oktyabrsky Selsoviet of Boguchansky District
Oktyabrsky, Idrinsky District, Krasnoyarsk Krai, a settlement in Dobromyslovsky Selsoviet of Idrinsky District

Kurgan Oblast
As of 2012, two rural localities in Kurgan Oblast bear this name:
Oktyabrsky, Kurgan Oblast, a settlement in Barinovsky Selsoviet of Shatrovsky District; 
Oktyabrskoye, Kurgan Oblast, a selo in Oktyabrsky Selsoviet of Petukhovsky District;

Kursk Oblast
As of 2012, four rural localities in Kursk Oblast bear this name:
Oktyabrsky, Dmitriyevsky District, Kursk Oblast, a settlement in Melovsky Selsoviet of Dmitriyevsky District
Oktyabrsky, Lgovsky District, Kursk Oblast, a khutor in Gorodensky Selsoviet of Lgovsky District
Oktyabrskoye, Rylsky District, Kursk Oblast, a selo in Oktyabrsky Selsoviet of Rylsky District
Oktyabrskoye, Sovetsky District, Kursk Oblast, a selo in Oktyabrsky Selsoviet of Sovetsky District

Leningrad Oblast
As of 2012, one rural locality in Leningrad Oblast bears this name:
Oktyabrskoye, Leningrad Oblast, a settlement in Polyanskoye Settlement Municipal Formation of Vyborgsky District;

Lipetsk Oblast
As of 2012, one rural locality in Lipetsk Oblast bears this name:
Oktyabrskoye, Lipetsk Oblast, a selo in Oktyabrsky Selsoviet of Usmansky District;

Mari El Republic
As of 2012, three rural localities in the Mari El Republic bear this name:
Oktyabrsky, Krasnovolzhsky Rural Okrug, Gornomariysky District, Mari El Republic, a settlement in Krasnovolzhsky Rural Okrug of Gornomariysky District; 
Oktyabrsky, Vilovatovsky Rural Okrug, Gornomariysky District, Mari El Republic, a vyselok in Vilovatovsky Rural Okrug of Gornomariysky District; 
Oktyabrsky, Morkinsky District, Mari El Republic, a settlement in Oktyabrsky Rural Okrug of Morkinsky District;

Republic of Mordovia
As of 2012, two rural localities in the Republic of Mordovia bear this name:
Oktyabrsky, Ardatovsky District, Republic of Mordovia, a settlement in Oktyabrsky Selsoviet of Ardatovsky District; 
Oktyabrsky, Ichalkovsky District, Republic of Mordovia, a settlement in Ladsky Selsoviet of Ichalkovsky District;

Moscow Oblast
As of 2012, five inhabited localities in Moscow Oblast bear this name:

Urban localities
Oktyabrsky, Lyuberetsky District, Moscow Oblast, a work settlement in Lyuberetsky District; 

Rural localities
Oktyabrsky, Istrinsky District, Moscow Oblast, a settlement in Bukarevskoye Rural Settlement of Istrinsky District; 
Oktyabrsky, Odintsovsky District, Moscow Oblast, a settlement under the administrative jurisdiction of the Town of Golitsyno in Odintsovsky District; 
Oktyabrsky, Stupinsky District, Moscow Oblast, a settlement under the administrative jurisdiction of Mikhnevo Work Settlement in Stupinsky District; 
Oktyabrskoye, Moscow Oblast, a selo in Zarudenskoye Rural Settlement of Kolomensky District;

Republic of North Ossetia-Alania
As of 2012, two rural localities in the Republic of North Ossetia-Alania bear this name:
Oktyabrskoye, Mozdoksky District, North Ossetia–Alania, a selo in Tersky Rural Okrug of Mozdoksky District; 
Oktyabrskoye, Prigorodny District, North Ossetia–Alania, a selo in Oktyabrsky Rural Okrug of Prigorodny District;

Novgorod Oblast
As of 2012, one rural locality in Novgorod Oblast bears this name:
Oktyabrsky, Novgorod Oblast, a settlement in Kalininskoye Settlement of Moshenskoy District

Novosibirsk Oblast
As of 2012, five rural localities in Novosibirsk Oblast bear this name:
Oktyabrsky, Iskitimsky District, Novosibirsk Oblast, a settlement in Iskitimsky District; 
Oktyabrsky, Krasnozyorsky District, Novosibirsk Oblast, a settlement in Krasnozyorsky District; 
Oktyabrsky, Moshkovsky District, Novosibirsk Oblast, a settlement in Moshkovsky District; 
Oktyabrsky, Ust-Tarksky District, Novosibirsk Oblast (or Oktyabrskoye), a settlement in Ust-Tarksky District; 
Oktyabrskoye, Novosibirsk Oblast (or Oktyabrsky), a selo in Karasuksky District;

Omsk Oblast
As of 2012, four rural localities in Omsk Oblast bear this name:
Oktyabrsky, Omsky District, Omsk Oblast, a settlement in Kalininsky Rural Okrug of Omsky District; 
Oktyabrsky, Tyukalinsky District, Omsk Oblast, a settlement in Oktyabrsky Rural Okrug of Tyukalinsky District; 
Oktyabrskoye, Gorkovsky District, Omsk Oblast, a selo in Oktyabrsky Rural Okrug of Gorkovsky District; 
Oktyabrskoye, Okoneshnikovsky District, Omsk Oblast, a village in Krasovsky Rural Okrug of Okoneshnikovsky District;

Orenburg Oblast
As of 2012, five rural localities in Orenburg Oblast bear this name:
Oktyabrsky, Buguruslansky District, Orenburg Oblast, a settlement in Yelatomsky Selsoviet of Buguruslansky District
Oktyabrsky, Kvarkensky District, Orenburg Oblast, a settlement in Kvarkensky Selsoviet of Kvarkensky District
Oktyabrsky, Sorochinsky District, Orenburg Oblast, a settlement in Roshchinsky Selsoviet of Sorochinsky District
Oktyabrskoye, Oktyabrsky District, Orenburg Oblast, a selo in Oktyabrsky Selsoviet of Oktyabrsky District
Oktyabrskoye, Severny District, Orenburg Oblast, a selo in Rychkovsky Selsoviet of Severny District

Oryol Oblast
As of 2012, one rural locality in Oryol Oblast bears this name:
Oktyabrsky, Oryol Oblast, a settlement in Berezovsky Selsoviet of Dmitrovsky District;

Penza Oblast
As of 2012, six rural localities in Penza Oblast bear this name:
Oktyabrsky, Belinsky District, Penza Oblast, a settlement in Studensky Selsoviet of Belinsky District
Oktyabrsky, Kamensky District, Penza Oblast, a settlement in Fedorovsky Selsoviet of Kamensky District
Oktyabrsky, Narovchatsky District, Penza Oblast, a settlement in Novopichursky Selsoviet of Narovchatsky District
Oktyabrskoye, Neverkinsky District, Penza Oblast, a selo in Oktyabrsky Selsoviet of Neverkinsky District
Oktyabrskoye, Serdobsky District, Penza Oblast, a settlement in Roshchinsky Selsoviet of Serdobsky District
Oktyabrskaya, Penza Oblast, a village in Krasnopolsky Selsoviet of Penzensky District

Perm Krai
As of 2012, five inhabited localities in Perm Krai bear this name:

Urban localities
Oktyabrsky, Oktyabrsky District, Perm Krai, a work settlement in Oktyabrsky District

Rural localities
Oktyabrsky, Dobryanka, Perm Krai, a settlement under the administrative jurisdiction of the town of krai significance of Dobryanka
Oktyabrsky, Ilyinsky District, Perm Krai, a settlement in Ilyinsky District
Oktyabrsky, Kochyovsky District, Perm Krai, a settlement in Kochyovsky District
Oktyabrsky, Permsky District, Perm Krai, a settlement in Permsky District

Primorsky Krai
As of 2012, one rural locality in Primorsky Krai bears this name:
Oktyabrskoye, Primorsky Krai, a selo in Khankaysky District

Rostov Oblast
As of 2012, six rural localities in Rostov Oblast bear this name:
Oktyabrsky, Aksaysky District, Rostov Oblast, a settlement in Shchepkinskoye Rural Settlement of Aksaysky District; 
Oktyabrsky, Krasnosulinsky District, Rostov Oblast, a settlement in Udarnikovskoye Rural Settlement of Krasnosulinsky District; 
Oktyabrsky, Millerovsky District, Rostov Oblast, a khutor in Pervomayskoye Rural Settlement of Millerovsky District; 
Oktyabrsky, Rodionovo-Nesvetaysky District, Rostov Oblast, a khutor in Kuteynikovskoye Rural Settlement of Rodionovo-Nesvetaysky District; 
Oktyabrsky, Verkhnedonskoy District, Rostov Oblast, a settlement in Meshkovskoye Rural Settlement of Verkhnedonskoy District; 
Oktyabrskoye, Rostov Oblast, a selo in Gulyay-Borisovskoye Rural Settlement of Zernogradsky District;

Ryazan Oblast
As of 2012, two inhabited localities in Ryazan Oblast bear this name:

Urban localities
Oktyabrsky, Ryazan Oblast, a work settlement in Mikhaylovsky District

Rural localities
Oktyabrskoye, Ryazan Oblast, a selo in Oktyabrsky Rural Okrug of Pronsky District

Sakhalin Oblast
As of 2012, one rural locality in Sakhalin Oblast bears this name:
Oktyabrskoye, Sakhalin Oblast, a selo in Dolinsky District

Samara Oblast
As of 2012, two rural localities in Samara Oblast bear this name:
Oktyabrsky, Pokhvistnevo, Samara Oblast, a settlement under the administrative jurisdiction of the town of oblast significance of Pokhvistnevo
Oktyabrsky, Kinelsky District, Samara Oblast, a settlement in Kinelsky District

Saratov Oblast
As of 2012, seven rural localities in Saratov Oblast bear this name:
Oktyabrsky, Arkadaksky District, Saratov Oblast, a settlement in Arkadaksky District
Oktyabrsky, Balashovsky District, Saratov Oblast, a settlement in Balashovsky District
Oktyabrsky, Dergachyovsky District, Saratov Oblast, a settlement in Dergachyovsky District
Oktyabrsky, Krasnopartizansky District, Saratov Oblast, a settlement in Krasnopartizansky District
Oktyabrsky, Lysogorsky District, Saratov Oblast, a settlement in Lysogorsky District
Oktyabrsky, Perelyubsky District, Saratov Oblast, a settlement in Perelyubsky District
Oktyabrsky, Yershovsky District, Saratov Oblast, a settlement in Yershovsky District

Smolensk Oblast
As of 2012, four rural localities in Smolensk Oblast bear this name:
Oktyabrsky, Smolensk Oblast, a village in Yushkovskoye Rural Settlement of Vyazemsky District
Oktyabrskoye, Khislavichsky District, Smolensk Oblast, a village in Kozhukhovichskoye Rural Settlement of Khislavichsky District
Oktyabrskoye, Slobodskoye Rural Settlement, Monastyrshchinsky District, Smolensk Oblast, a selo in Slobodskoye Rural Settlement of Monastyrshchinsky District
Oktyabrskoye, Tatarskoye Rural Settlement, Monastyrshchinsky District, Smolensk Oblast, a village in Tatarskoye Rural Settlement of Monastyrshchinsky District

Stavropol Krai
As of 2012, one rural locality in Stavropol Krai bears this name:
Oktyabrskoye, Stavropol Krai, a selo in Oktyabrsky Selsoviet of Ipatovsky District

Sverdlovsk Oblast
As of 2012, eight rural localities in Sverdlovsk Oblast bear this name:
Oktyabrsky, Beryozovsky, Sverdlovsk Oblast, a settlement under the administrative jurisdiction of the Town of Beryozovsky
Oktyabrsky, Beloyarsky District, Sverdlovsk Oblast, a settlement in Kochnevsky Selsoviet of Beloyarsky District
Oktyabrsky, Kamensky District, Sverdlovsk Oblast, a settlement in Sosnovsky Selsoviet of Kamensky District
Oktyabrsky, Kamyshlovsky District, Sverdlovsk Oblast, a settlement in Oktyabrsky Selsoviet of Kamyshlovsky District
Oktyabrsky, Nizhneserginsky District, Sverdlovsk Oblast, a settlement under the administrative jurisdiction of Bisert Work Settlement in Nizhneserginsky District
Oktyabrsky, Sysertsky District, Sverdlovsk Oblast, a settlement in Oktyabrsky Selsoviet of Sysertsky District
Oktyabrsky, Talitsky District, Sverdlovsk Oblast, a settlement in Chupinsky Selsoviet of Talitsky District
Oktyabrskoye, Sverdlovsk Oblast, a selo in Cheremissky Selsoviet of Rezhevsky District

Tambov Oblast
As of 2012, one rural locality in Tambov Oblast bears this name:
Oktyabrskoye, Tambov Oblast, a selo in Podlesny Selsoviet of Sosnovsky District

Republic of Tatarstan
As of 2012, two rural localities in the Republic of Tatarstan bear this name:
Oktyabrsky, Verkhneuslonsky District, Republic of Tatarstan, a settlement in Verkhneuslonsky District
Oktyabrsky, Zelenodolsky District, Republic of Tatarstan, a settlement in Zelenodolsky District

Tomsk Oblast
As of 2012, two rural localities in Tomsk Oblast bear this name:
Oktyabrsky, Tomsk Oblast, a settlement in Alexandrovsky District
Oktyabrskoye, Tomsk Oblast, a selo in Tomsky District

Tula Oblast
As of 2012, eight rural localities in Tula Oblast bear this name:
Oktyabrsky, Arsenyevsky District, Tula Oblast, a settlement in Belokolodezsky Rural Okrug of Arsenyevsky District
Oktyabrsky, Kireyevsky District, Tula Oblast, a settlement in Oktyabrsky Rural Okrug of Kireyevsky District
Oktyabrsky, Leninsky District, Tula Oblast, a settlement in Oktyabrsky Rural Okrug of Leninsky District
Oktyabrsky, Plavsky District, Tula Oblast, a settlement in Oktyabrsky Rural Okrug of Plavsky District
Oktyabrsky, Shchyokinsky District, Tula Oblast, a settlement in Lomintsevskaya Rural Administration of Shchyokinsky District
Oktyabrsky, Venyovsky District, Tula Oblast, a settlement in Belkovsky Rural Okrug of Venyovsky District
Oktyabrsky, Kozminsky Rural Okrug, Yefremovsky District, Tula Oblast, a settlement in Kozminsky Rural Okrug of Yefremovsky District
Oktyabrsky, Oktyabrsky Rural Okrug, Yefremovsky District, Tula Oblast, a settlement in Oktyabrsky Rural Okrug of Yefremovsky District

Tver Oblast
As of 2012, two rural localities in Tver Oblast bear this name:
Oktyabrsky, Tver Oblast, a settlement in Solnechnoye Rural Settlement of Vyshnevolotsky District
Oktyabrskoye, Tver Oblast, a village in Voroshilovskoye Rural Settlement of Penovsky District

Tyumen Oblast
As of 2012, five rural localities in Tyumen Oblast bear this name:
Oktyabrsky, Aromashevsky District, Tyumen Oblast, a settlement in Aromashevsky Rural Okrug of Aromashevsky District
Oktyabrsky, Ishimsky District, Tyumen Oblast, a settlement in Karasulsky Rural Okrug of Ishimsky District
Oktyabrsky, Tobolsky District, Tyumen Oblast, a settlement in Verkhnearemzyansky Rural Okrug of Tobolsky District
Oktyabrsky, Uporovsky District, Tyumen Oblast, a settlement in Yemurtlinsky Rural Okrug of Uporovsky District
Oktyabrskaya, Tyumen Oblast, a village in Krasnoorlovsky Rural Okrug of Armizonsky District

Udmurt Republic
As of 2012, five rural localities in the Udmurt Republic bear this name:
Oktyabrsky, Glazovsky District, Udmurt Republic, a selo in Oktyabrsky Selsoviet of Glazovsky District
Oktyabrsky, Sarapulsky District, Udmurt Republic, a selo in Sarapulsky District
Oktyabrsky, Vavozhsky District, Udmurt Republic, a village in Kakmozhsky Selsoviet of Vavozhsky District
Oktyabrsky, Zavyalovsky District, Udmurt Republic, a selo in Oktyabrsky Selsoviet of Zavyalovsky District
Oktyabrskaya, Udmurt Republic, a village in Mikhaylovsky Selsoviet of Kambarsky District

Ulyanovsk Oblast
As of 2012, three rural localities in Ulyanovsk Oblast bear this name:
Oktyabrsky, Cherdaklinsky District, Ulyanovsk Oblast, a settlement in Oktyabrsky Rural Okrug of Cherdaklinsky District
Oktyabrsky, Radishchevsky District, Ulyanovsk Oblast, a settlement in Oktyabrsky Rural Okrug of Radishchevsky District
Oktyabrskoye, Ulyanovsk Oblast, a selo in Kholstovsky Rural Okrug of Pavlovsky District

Vladimir Oblast
As of 2012, two rural localities in Vladimir Oblast bear this name:
Oktyabrsky, Vladimir Oblast, a settlement in Vyaznikovsky District
Oktyabrskaya, Vladimir Oblast, a village in Vyaznikovsky District

Volgograd Oblast
As of 2012, three inhabited localities in Volgograd Oblast bear this name:

Urban localities
Oktyabrsky, Oktyabrsky District, Volgograd Oblast, a work settlement in Oktyabrsky District

Rural localities
Oktyabrsky, Kalachyovsky District, Volgograd Oblast, a settlement in Sovetsky Selsoviet of Kalachyovsky District
Oktyabrsky, Olkhovsky District, Volgograd Oblast, a settlement in Oktyabrsky Selsoviet of Olkhovsky District

Vologda Oblast
As of 2012, three rural localities in Vologda Oblast bear this name:
Oktyabrsky, Totemsky District, Vologda Oblast, a settlement in Matveyevsky Selsoviet of Totemsky District
Oktyabrsky, Vashkinsky District, Vologda Oblast, a settlement in Ivanovsky Selsoviet of Vashkinsky District
Oktyabrsky, Vytegorsky District, Vologda Oblast, a settlement in Saminsky Selsoviet of Vytegorsky District

Voronezh Oblast
As of 2012, four rural localities in Voronezh Oblast bear this name:
Oktyabrsky, Ertilsky District, Voronezh Oblast, a settlement in Pervomayskoye Rural Settlement of Ertilsky District
Oktyabrsky, Paninsky District, Voronezh Oblast, a settlement in Oktyabrskoye Rural Settlement of Paninsky District
Oktyabrsky, Povorinsky District, Voronezh Oblast, a settlement in Dobrovolskoye Rural Settlement of Povorinsky District
Oktyabrskoye, Voronezh Oblast, a selo in Oktyabrskoye Rural Settlement of Povorinsky District

Yaroslavl Oblast
As of 2012, one rural locality in Yaroslavl Oblast bears this name:
Oktyabrsky, Yaroslavl Oblast, a settlement in Oktyabrsky Rural Okrug of Rybinsky District

Zabaykalsky Krai
As of 2012, one rural locality in Zabaykalsky Krai bears this name:
Oktyabrsky, Zabaykalsky Krai, a settlement in Krasnokamensky District

Abolished localities
Oktyabrsky, Murmansk Oblast, an inhabited locality under the administrative jurisdiction of Kirovsk Town with Jurisdictional Territory in Murmansk Oblast; abolished in April 2013
Oktyabrsky, Sakha Republic, a selo in Oymyakonsky District of the Sakha Republic; abolished in August 2007
Oktyabrskaya, Irkutsk Oblast, a village in Ekhirit-Bulagatsky District; abolished in June 2015

Alternative names
Oktyabrsky, alternative name of Krasnooktyabrsky, a settlement in Maykopsky District of the Republic of Adygea; 
Oktyabrsky, alternative name of Takhtamukay, an aul in Takhtamukaysky District of the Republic of Adygea; 
Oktyabrsky, alternative name of Oktyabrsk, a village in Alegazovsky Selsoviet of Mechetlinsky District in the Republic of Bashkortostan; 
Oktyabrsky, alternative name of Novoye Lidzhe, a selo in Araksky Selsoviet of Tabasaransky District in the Republic of Dagestan; 
Oktyabrsky, alternative name of Khosheut, a settlement in Khosheutovskaya Rural Administration of Oktyabrsky District in the Republic of Kalmykia; 
Oktyabrskoye, alternative name of Oktyabr, a selo under the administrative jurisdiction of Podosinovets Urban-Type Settlement in Podosinovsky District of Kirov Oblast; 
Oktyabrsky, alternative name of Popovka, a settlement in Karasuksky District of Novosibirsk Oblast; 
Oktyabrskoye, alternative name of Novomoshkovskoye, a selo in Moshkovsky District of Novosibirsk Oblast;

Notes